Hellinsia hololeucos is a moth of the family Pterophoridae. It is found in Chile.

The wingspan is 15‑19 mm.  The forewings are silvery white, mixed with sparse scales with an ochreous gloss. The hindwings and fringes are silvery‑white. Adults are on wing in February and from October to December.

The hostplant is unknown, but adults have been recorded flying around Salvia species.

References

Moths described in 1874
hololeucos
Pterophoridae of South America
Fauna of Chile
Moths of South America
Endemic fauna of Chile